Thomas Dundas may refer to:

 Thomas Dundas (of Fingask and Carronhall) (died 1786), MP for Orkney and Shetland
 Thomas Dundas, 1st Baron Dundas (1741–1820), British politician
 Thomas Dundas (British Army officer) (1750–1794), governor of Guadaloupe
 Thomas Dundas (Royal Navy officer) (c. 1765–1841), British naval officer of the Napoleonic Wars
 Thomas Dundas, 2nd Earl of Zetland (1795–1873), British nobleman and politician
 Thomas Dundas (High Sheriff) of Sussex